The Anushtegin dynasty or Anushteginids (English:), also known as the Khwarazmian dynasty was a Persianate Sunni Muslim dynasty of Turkic mamluk origin from the Bekdili clan of the Oghuz Turks. The Anushteginid dynasty ruled the Khwarazmian Empire, consisting in large parts of present-day Central Asia, Afghanistan and Iran in the approximate period of 1077 to 1231, first as vassals of the Seljuks and the Qara Khitai (Western Liao), and later as independent rulers, up until the Mongol conquest of the Khwarazmian Empire in the 13th century. 

The dynasty was founded by commander Anushtegin Gharchai, a former Turkic slave of the Seljuq sultans, who was appointed as governor of Khwarazm. His son, Qutb ad-Din Muhammad I, became the first hereditary Shah of Khwarazm. Anush Tigin may have belonged to either the Begdili tribe of the Oghuz Turks or to Chigil, Khalaj, Qipchaq, Qangly, or Uyghurs.

History

The date of the founding of the Khwarazmian dynasty remains debatable. During a revolt in 1017, Khwarezmian rebels murdered Abu'l-Abbas Ma'mun and his wife, Hurra-ji, sister of the Ghaznavid sultan Mahmud. In response, Mahmud invaded and occupied the region of Khwarezm, which included Nasa and the ribat of Farawa. As a result, Khwarezm became a province of the Ghaznavid Empire from 1017 to 1034. In 1077, the governorship of the province, which since 1042/1043 belonged to the Seljuqs, fell into the hands of Anush Tigin Gharchai, a former Turkic slave of the Seljuq sultan. In 1141, the Seljuq Sultan Ahmed Sanjar was defeated by the Qara Khitai at the battle of Qatwan, and Anush Tigin's grandson Ala ad-Din Atsiz became a vassal to Yelü Dashi of the Qara Khitan.

Sultan Ahmed Sanjar died in 1156. As the Seljuk state fell into chaos, the Khwarezm-Shahs expanded their territories southward. In 1194, the last Sultan of the Great Seljuq Empire, Toghrul III, was defeated and killed by the Khwarezm ruler Ala ad-Din Tekish, who conquered parts of Khorasan and western Iran. In 1200, Tekish died and was succeeded by his son, Ala ad-Din Muhammad, who initiated a conflict with the Ghurids and was defeated by them at Amu Darya (1204). Following the sack of Khwarizm, Muhammad appealed for aid from his suzerain, the Qara Khitai who sent him an army. With this reinforcement, Muhammad won a victory over the Ghurids at Hezarasp (1204) and forced them out of Khwarizm.

Ala ad-Din Muhammad's alliance with his suzerain was short-lived. He again initiated a conflict, this time with the aid of the Kara-Khanids, and defeated a Qara-Khitai army at Talas (1210), but allowed Samarkand (1210) to be occupied by the Qara-Khitai. He overthrew the Karakhanids (1212) and Ghurids (1215). In 1212, he shifted his capital from Gurganj to Samarkand. Thus incorporating nearly the whole of Transoxania and present-day Afghanistan into his empire, which after further conquests in western Persia (by 1217) stretched from the Syr Darya to the Zagros Mountains, and from the northern parts of the Hindu Kush to the Caspian Sea. By 1218, the empire had a population of 5 million people.

Anushteginid Khwarazmshahs

Purple Row Signifies Seljuq Empire rule.
Pink Row Signifies suzerainty shifting between Qara-Khitai & Seljuq Empire
Orange Rows Signify suzerainty of Qara-Khitai

Family tree of Anushtiginid Dynasty

Gallery

See also
Full list of Persian Kingdoms
Khwarezmia
List of Sunni Muslim dynasties

Notes and references

Further reading
M. Ismail Marcinkowski, Persian Historiography and Geography: Bertold Spuler on Major Works Produced in Iran, the Caucasus, Central Asia, India and Early Ottoman Turkey, with a foreword by Professor Clifford Edmund Bosworth, member of the British Academy, Singapore: Pustaka Nasional, 2003, .

 
 
1231 disestablishments in Asia
States and territories established in 1077
Medieval Azerbaijan
Former empires in Asia
11th century in Iran
12th century in Iran
13th century in Iran
Medieval Khorasan
Turkic dynasties
Sunni dynasties

hu:Hvárezmi sahok listája